Pancreatic acinar metaplasia (PAM) is a common incidental histopathologic finding present in approximately 20-25% of patients undergoing an esophagogastroduodenoscopy.

Signs and symptoms
Studies are mixed on whether it is associated with pathology and symptoms. There is some epidemiological evidence to suggest is associated with gastroesophageal reflux and Helicobacter gastritis.

There is no evidence to suggest it is pre-neoplastic, like Barrett's esophagus.

Cause
A slight increased incidence with age suggests it is an acquired lesion, as may be seen in a true metaplasia.

Histopathology
The histopathologic features of pancreatic acinar metaplasia are: (1)
the presence of cell clusters that resembles a many-lobed "berry" (an acinus), with (2) cells that are histomorphologically identical to the glands of the exocrine pancreas.

See also
Metaplasia

References

Digestive system neoplasia